Leonard Sogoloff (November 24, 1923 - July 12, 2014) was a music club owner and jazz aficionado who owned and ran Lennie's on the Turnpike, a jazz club located on Route One North in Peabody, Massachusetts, from the mid-1950s to 1972. The Peabody location was lost in a fire in 1971 and the club was briefly located at a nearby Holiday Inn, and finally Village Green in Danvers.

Sogoloff presented initially only a jukebox with jazz music on before blues and jazz musicians presented live from 1963. Jay Leno opened for the musical acts from January 1972 to September 1972. Live musical acts included Duke Ellington, Buddy Rich, Kris Kristofferson, Miles Davis, Dizzie Gillespie, and Stan Kenton.

Sogoloff bequeathed his collection of memorabilia to Salem State University, including a number of photos.

References 

People from Salem, Massachusetts
People from Peabody, Massachusetts
Jazz people
1923 births
2014 deaths